Aldor Ingebrigtsen (16 February 1888  –  14 November 1952) was a Norwegian politician for the Labour Party.

He was born in the hamlet of Lyfjord, on the island of Kvaløya in Tromsøysund municipality.

He was elected to the Norwegian Parliament from Troms in 1922, and was re-elected on seven occasions. During his eighth term, he died and was replaced by Hans Kristian Hauan.

Ingebrigtsen was a member of Tromsøysund municipality from 1916 to 1919, and later of its executive committee from 1925 to 1934.

References

1888 births
1952 deaths
Labour Party (Norway) politicians
Members of the Storting
20th-century Norwegian politicians